Ihor Podolchak (born April 9, 1962) is a Ukrainian filmmaker and visual artist. He is a co-founder of the creative association Masoch Fund, participant of the Ukrainian New Wave.

Ihor Podolchak was named as one of the 10 most prominent Ukrainian filmmakers by Forbes Ukraine in 2014, member of Ukrainian Film Academy.

Biography
Podolchak was born in Lviv, Ukrainian SSR, USSR (now Ukraine). He graduated from Lviv Academy of Fine Arts (then Lviv State Institute of Applied and Decorative Arts) with distinction in 1984. From 1984 to 1985 he served in the Soviet Border Troops on the Soviet-Polish border.

From 1985 to 1986 he worked in the Art Fund of the Union of Artists of Ukraine. Since 1986 - a free artist and curator of contemporary art. Participant and laureate of numerous international exhibitions, organized and held a number of international exhibitions in Ukraine, Russia, USA, Norway.

After establishing the Masoch Fund, together with Igor Durich, he actively conducted various artistic projects in Ukraine, in Russia, in Germany. Since 1997, he has been engaged in the integrated design of the visual-image component of political election campaigns in Ukraine and Russia. Since 2006, he writes scripts, shoots and produces movies:
 Las Meninas - 2008, full length, Ukraine
 Delirium - 2013, full length, Ukraine, Czech Republic
 Merry-Go-Round - 2017, short length, Ukraine, Poland

Visual arts

Podolchak works in different genres of fine art - painting, prints, photography, video art and art actions. At the beginning of his career, the graphics prevailed, and from the mid-1990s makes art actions and performances, from the late 1990s video art.

In the center of Podolchak's creativity, is a human body in its various manifestations, relationships with other bodies, as well as in different stages of decomposition. In the artistic development of the theme of decomposition and decay there are only two types of matter, two definite formations of "flesh" - human and architectural. They are the receptacles of all sorts of energies, the connections of various semiotic codes - the most clearly demonstrated manifestations of regressive forces. The propensity to the metamorphoses of decomposition reveals and, in a special way, mythologizes the "corporeality" of these two organisms, and the inconstancy of the point of view on their relations in this state (fluctuations from allegory to thriller), constantly improves the iconography of Podolchak's aesthetics in general.

The artist's book Jacob Bohme was awarded as World's Best Book (Bronze Medal) by Stiftung Buchkunst Frankfurt am Main at Frankfurt Book Fair. One of his 24 personal exhibitions was the first art exhibition ever to be held in space, at space station Mir on January 25, 1993. Artworks of Podolchak can be found in 26 museums and public collections worldwide.

Cinema

Both Podolchak's films have common characteristic features: departure from narrative, anthropology of enclosed worlds, elaborated composition of frame, unusual shooting angles. The spaces of Las Meninas and Delirium are similarly dense, difficult for movement, tiresome both for the characters moving within them and the viewers watching them. This reflects the time of "the end of history" with its somnambulism, impotence, morbidity and hopelessness.

Las Meninas

Las Meninas is Podolchak's debut full-length film. He wrote, directed and produced it. The film had a world premiere at the International Film Festival Rotterdam in the competition program on January 25, 2008. Overall, it has participated in 27 international film festivals, including 10 competition programs.

Delirium

Delirium is Podolchak's second full-length feature. Its script is based on the story Inductor by the Ukrainian writer and journalist Dmytro Belyanskyi. The film's production lasted during 2008–2010. For the first time fragments of the film were demonstrated in 2012 on the 45th Karlovy Vary International Film Festival in the program Films in production. New full-length films from Central and Eastern Europe. After the prerelease screenings, Ukrainian film critics compared the second film of Podolchak to the works of Alain Robbe-Grillet, Pedro Costa and Nikos Nikolaidis.

Position 5 in Top-10 Ukrainian films of 2012 by «Афіша@Mail.Ru».

Merry-Go-Round

The first short length film (2017. Ukraine, Poland. 5 min). It was premiered at Revelation Perth International Film Festival on July 9, 2017 and was nominated for the Best Ukrainian Short Film at Odesa International Film Festival.

Selected prizes and nominations 
Prizes:
 2013 «First Prize», Baghdad International Film Festival, Iraq
 1995 «Triennaleprize», 11th Norway International Print Triennial, Fredrikstad
 1994 «Walter Tiemann Preis», Verein zur Förderung von Grafik und Buchkunst Leipzig e.V. an der Hochschule für Grafik und Buchkunst in Leipzig
 1990 «Latvian Artist Union Prize», Triennial of miniature graphic art, Riga
 1990 «1st Award for graphics», 5th Annual International Art Exhibition, Marietta, USA
 1989 «Diploma», International Biennial of Art Impreza, Ivano-Frankivsk, Ukraine
 1988 «Prix Ex Aequo», 12th International Print Biennial, Cracow
 1987 «Honorable Medal», Small Graphic Forms, Łódź

Nominations:
 2017 «Best Ukrainian short film», Odesa International Film Festival
 2013 «National Prize», Odesa International Film Festival
 2013 «Best Director» Director's Week Competition, Fantasporto, Oporto International Film Festival, Porto
 2009 «Prize», Trieste Film Festival
 2008 «Tiger», 37th International Film Festival Rotterdam
 2008 «Prize FIPRESCI», 7th Transilvania International Film Festival, Cluj Napoca
 2008 «Prize», 16th Artfilm International Film Festival, Slovakia

Sources

 Last cantata. Ihor Podolchak : exhibition catalogue 11–28.07.2018. Kyiv : Golden Section, 2018. 38 p. 
100 Імен. Сучасне мистецтво України періоду Незалежності. (100 names. Contemporary Ukrainian Art from the Independence Time.) Київ: Видавництво «Мысль», 2008  
 Bang-Heun C. Igor Podolchak. Catalog. Seoul: Gaain Gallery, 1992
 Böhme Jakob; Podolczak Igor; Tomkowski Jan. Artist's Book. Lodz: Correspondance des Arts II, 1993. 
 Callaghan B. Fifteen Years in Exile. Toronto: Exile Editions, 1992 
 Dyurych I,; Podolchak, I. Art in Space . Special Edition for São Paulo Biennial. Kyiv: Masoch Fund, 1994
 Dyurych, I.; Podolchak, Ihor. Последний еврейский погром (The Last Jewish Pogrom).  Kyiv: Masoch Fund, 1995 
 Dyurych, Ihor; Podolchak, I.; Тistol, О. Igor Podolchak : immoral-immortal. Lviv: Masoch Fund, 1999. 
 Ewins, R.; Colless E. Igor Podolchak. Ukrainian Printmaker. Catalog. Hobart: University of Tasmania, 1991
 Flashback. Українське медіа-мистецтво 1990-х. Ukrainian media art of the 1990s. Catalog. Curators: Oleksandr Solovyov, Solomiya Savchuk. Київ: ДП НКММК Мистецький Арсенал, 2018. — 180 p. , Pages 16, 24, 40-41, 117
 Fur, G. Dictionnaire du BDSM. Paris: La Musardine, 2016, pp. 3, 108, 153, 274. , 
 Grenzgänger: acht Künstler aus der Ukraine. Linz: Büro für Kulturelle Auslandsbeziehungen des Landes Oberösterreich, 1994. 
 Matuszak, G.; Wozniak, Taras. Igor Podolchak. Lodz: Biuro Wystaw artystycznych, 1988
 Mikhaylovska O.; Podolchak, I.; Taranenko, A. Corpus delicti : post-erotic art photography.  Prague: Masoch Fund, 1998. 
 Pethő, Ágnes. The Cinema of Sensations. Cambridge: Cambridge Scholars Publishing, 2015, pp. 155–182,  
 Pomiędzy. Polonistyczno-Ukrainoznawcze Studia Naukowe. Warsaw: University of Warsaw, Nr 1 (2015), pp. 137–146 Ciało cierpiące jako widowisko w malarstwie Igora Podolczaka i Wasylija Cagolowa / Marta Zambrzycka. ISSN 2543-9227 
 Raine, C.; Podolczak, Igor. Gilgamesh. Lodz, Poland : Book Art Museum, 1995. 
 Rosiak, M. Igor Podolczak. Grafika. Catalog. Poznan: Galeria'72, 1989
 Rudel, J. Apocalypses: Rencontres Du Manege Royal.. La Garenne-Colombes: Editions de l'Espace européen, 1991  
 Voznyak, T. Ihor Podolchak. Catalog. Lviv: Ukrainian Independent Center of Contemporary Art, 1991.  
 Лук'янець В., Носко К. Де кураторство. (Where is the curatorial). — Х.: IST Publishing. 2017. — 256 p. Pages 40–47.  
 Mистецька мапа України: Львів — живопис, графіка, скульптура. (Art Map of Ukraine: Lviv - painting, prints, sculpture.) Kyiv: I︠U︡velir-pres, 2008.

References

External links
 
 Ihor Podolchak at YouTube
  Ihor Podolchak at Scribd
 Ihor Podolchak  at Issuu
 

1962 births
Living people
Film people from Lviv
20th-century Ukrainian painters
20th-century Ukrainian male artists
21st-century Ukrainian painters
21st-century Ukrainian male artists
Ukrainian film producers
Ukrainian film directors
Ukrainian screenwriters
Ukrainian film editors
Ukrainian printmakers
Ukrainian photographers
Ukrainian etchers
20th-century printmakers
Surrealist artists
Ukrainian experimental filmmakers
Surrealist filmmakers
Ukrainian contemporary artists
Ukrainian male painters